Sunil Gupta (born 1953) is an Indian-born Canadian photographer, based in London. His career has been spent "making work responding to the injustices suffered by gay men across the globe, himself included", including themes of sexual identity, migration, race and family. Gupta has produced a number of books and his work is held in the collections of the Museum of Modern Art in New York, Philadelphia Museum of Art, and Tate. In 2020 he was awarded Honorary Fellowship of the Royal Photographic Society.

Early life and education
Gupta was born in New Delhi, India in 1953. In 1969, he migrated to Montreal, Canada with his family.

He studied at Dawson College, Montreal (1970–1972); gained a Bachelor of Commerce in accountancy at Concordia University, Montreal (1972–1977); studied photography at The New School for Social Research in New York City (1976); gained a diploma in photography at West Surrey College of Art and Design, Farnham, UK (1978–1981); gained an MA in photography at the Royal College of Art in London (1981–1983); and gained a PhD at University of Westminster, London (2018).

Life and work
Gupta embraced his sexuality for the first time when he arrived at Concordia University in Montreal in 1970. He joined a campus gay liberation movement group and took photographs for its newspaper.

His career has been spent "making work responding to the injustices suffered by gay men across the globe, himself included", including themes of sexual identity, migration, race and family. His series include the street photography of Christopher Street (1976); Reflections of the Black Experience (1986); Pretended Family Relationships (1988); Memorials (1995); the narrative portraits of From Here to Eternity (1999); and the highly staged and constructed scenes of The New Pre-Raphaelites (2008).

In 1983 Gupta settled in London. He was one of the founders of the Association of Black Photographers (now Autograph ABP) in London in 1988.

Personal life
Gupta is married to Charan Singh, also a photographer. They live in Camberwell, London.

Gupta was diagnosed with HIV in 1995.

Publications

Books of work by Gupta
Pictures From Here. 2003. .
Wish you Were Here: Memories of a gay life. New Delhi: Yoda, 2008. .
Queer. Prestel, 2011. .
Christopher Street 1976. London: Stanley/Barker, 2018. .
Lovers: Ten Years On. London: Stanley/Barker, 2020. .
London '82. London: Stanley/Barker, 2021. .

Books of work with others
Delhi: Communities of Belonging. With Charan Singh. New Press, 2016. .

Books edited by Gupta
An Economy of Signs: contemporary Indian photographs. Arts Council England; Rivers Oram, 1990.
Ecstatic Antibodies: resisting the AIDS mythology. Edited with Tessa Boffin. Arts Council England; Rivers Oram, 1990. . Photographs and text.
Disrupted Borders: an intervention in definitions of boundaries. London: Arts Council England; Rivers Oram, 1993.

Awards
2020: Honorary Fellowship of the Royal Photographic Society, Bristol

Exhibitions

Solo exhibitions and exhibitions paired with others
Trespass 3, Contemporary Art Gallery, Vancouver, 1994
Homelands, UCR/California Museum of Photography, University of California, Riverside, 2004
Sunil Gupta, Canadian Museum of Contemporary Photography, Ottawa, Canada, 2005/2006
Dissent and Desire, Contemporary Arts Museum Houston, Houston, Texas, 2018. With Charan Singh.
From Here to Eternity: Sunil Gupta. A Retrospective, The Photographers' Gallery, London, 2020/2021 Curated by Mark Sealy.

Exhibitions curated by Gupta
Ecstatic Antibodies, Impressions Gallery, York, 1990; and toured to Chapter Arts Centre, Cardiff, 1990/1991; and elsewhere.

Collections
Gupta's work is held in the following permanent collections:
Museum of Modern Art, New York: 2 prints (as of October 2020)
Philadelphia Museum of Art, Philadelphia, Pennsylvania
Tate, UK: 18 prints (as of October 2020)

References

External links

"Sunil Gupta’s life in photos" at i-D

Royal Photographic Society members
21st-century Canadian photographers
20th-century Canadian photographers
People with HIV/AIDS
Alumni of the University of Westminster
Alumni of the Royal College of Art
Alumni of the University for the Creative Arts
The New School alumni
Concordia University alumni
Dawson College alumni
People from New Delhi
1953 births
Living people
Indian LGBT photographers
Canadian LGBT photographers
21st-century Canadian LGBT people
20th-century Canadian LGBT people